Gongroneurina is a genus of flies in the family Stratiomyidae.

Species
Gongroneurina apidina (Enderlein, 1914)

References

Stratiomyidae
Brachycera genera
Monotypic Brachycera genera
Taxa named by Günther Enderlein
Diptera of Asia